Kingfisher 3A is a First Nations reserve on Kingfisher Lake in northwestern Ontario. It is one of three reserves of the Kingfisher First Nation.

References

External links
 Canada Lands Survey System

Oji-Cree reserves in Ontario
Communities in Kenora District